Kogila Moodley is a published academic and sociologist at the University of British Columbia, where she was the first holder of the David Lam Chair of Multicultural Studies. She serves on the board of directors of the International Sociological Association's Race Relations Committee, and was its President from (1998–2002).

Raised in the Indian community of apartheid South Africa, her expertise is focused on multiculturalism, anti-racism and ethnic and race relations. Moodley also researches Canadian educational and immigration policy, and political and economic developments in South Africa and the Middle East.

She is married to Heribert Adam, with whom she co-authored several books:
 
 
 
 

In addition, she has authored the following works:
 
 "The End of Apartheid: The Federalization of South Africa". Telos 92 (Summer 1992). New York: Telos Press.

References

Year of birth missing (living people)
Living people
Academic staff of the University of British Columbia
South African emigrants to Canada
University of British Columbia alumni
Michigan State University alumni